Decatur Street can refer to:

 Decatur Street (Atlanta), Georgia, U.S.
 Decatur Street (New Orleans), Louisiana, U.S.
 Decatur Street (Brooklyn), New York, U.S.

See also
 Decatur (disambiguation)